George W. Trippon (February 26, 1916 - January 1, 2010) was a Romanian-American teacher, fashion designer and author known for operating the Trippon Fashion Center design school in Los Angeles during the 1950s and for a long-running TV show "Sew, What's New?" on The Learning Channel during the 1980s and 1990s.

Trippon was born in 1916 in Aurora, Illinois to parents George and Mary, both Romanian immigrants. At age 9, he attended dance school and later appeared in a number of Hollywood musicals. He served in World War II as a Quartermaster, and after discharge, he studied fashion design in Paris and Los Angeles. He opened his own fashion design school and operated it during the 1950s. In 1956, he was elected president of the Hollywood Beauty League, an organization dedicated to promoting Los Angeles as a cultural hub.

In the 1970s, Trippon began presenting a television show "Sew, What's New?" on local television in Los Angeles; in the 1980s the show moved to The Learning Channel and broadcast there until the 1990s.

Trippon also authored several books on fashion design as well as memoirs.

Published works 
 "Becoming a Dress Designer: What Every Designer Should Know" 1970. 157 pgs.  ASIN: B000Q9PDM0
 "Sewing Tricks 'n' Treats". 1984. 59 pgs.  ASIN: B000GU4OGK 
 "Let's Design, Cut, Sew, & Fit with George W. Trippon". 1985. 139 pgs, 
 "Pigeon Hill: Growing up Romanian". 2001. 172 pgs. 
 "Ode to Jimmie: I Will See You Soon" 2007. 62 pgs.

References

American television hosts
American people of Romanian descent
American fashion designers
1916 births
2010 deaths